Jayant Vishnu Narlikar   (born 19 July 1938) is an Indian astrophysicist and emeritus professor at the Inter-University Centre for Astronomy and Astrophysics (IUCAA). He developed with Sir Fred Hoyle the conformal gravity theory, known as Hoyle–Narlikar theory. It synthesises Albert Einstein's theory of relativity and Mach's principle. It proposes that the inertial mass of a particle is a function of the masses of all other particles, multiplied by a coupling constant, which is a function of cosmic epoch.

Early life
Narlikar was born in Kolhapur, India on 19 July 1938 in a family of scholars. His father, Vishnu Vasudev Narlikar, was a mathematician and theoretical physicist who served as Professor and Head of Department of Mathematics at Banaras Hindu University, Varanasi, and mother, Sumati Narlikar, was a scholar of Sanskrit. His wife is Mangala Narlikar and he has three daughters. His maternal uncle was the distinguished statistician V. S. Huzurbazar.

Career
Narlikar completed his school education from Central Hindu College [now Central Hindu Boys School]. He received his BSc degree from Banaras Hindu University in 1957. He then began his studies at Cambridge University at Fitzwilliam College like his father, where he received a BA (Tripos) degree in mathematics in 1959 and was Senior Wrangler. In 1960, he won the Tyson Medal for astronomy. During his doctoral studies at Cambridge, he won the Smith's Prize in 1962. After receiving his PhD degree in 1963 under the guidance of Farhan Qutub, he served as a Berry Ramsey Fellow at King's College in Cambridge and earned a master's degree in astronomy and astrophysics in 1964. He continued to work as a Fellow at King's College until 1972. In 1966, Fred Hoyle established Institute of Theoretical Astronomy in Cambridge, and Narlikar served as the founding staff member of the institute during 1966–72. In 1972, Narlikar took up Professorship at the Tata Institute of Fundamental Research (TIFR) in Mumbai, India. At the TIFR, he was in charge of the Theoretical Astrophysics Group. In 1988, the Indian University Grants Commission set up the Inter-University Centre for Astronomy and Astrophysics (IUCAA) in Pune, and Narlikar became the Founder-Director of IUCAA. In 1981, Narlikar became a founding member of the World Cultural Council. Narlikar is known for his work in cosmology, especially in championing models alternative to the popular Big Bang model. During 1994–1997, he was the President of the Cosmology Commission of the International Astronomical Union. His research work has involved Mach's principle, quantum cosmology, and action-at-a-distance physics. Narlikar was part of a study which cultured microorganisms from stratospheric air samples obtained at 41 km. He was appointed as the chairperson of The Advisory Group for Textbooks in Science and Mathematics, the textbook development committee responsible for developing textbooks in Science and Mathematics, published by NCERT (National Council of Educational Research and Training).

Honours
Narlikar has received many national and international awards and honorary doctorates. India's second-highest civilian honour, Padma Vibhushan, was awarded to him in 2004 for his research work. Prior to this, in 1965, he was conferred Padma Bhushan. He was awarded 'Rashtra Bhushan' in 1981 by FIE Foundation, Ichalkaranji. He received Maharashtra Bhushan Award for the year 2010. He is a recipient of Bhatnagar Award, M.P. Birla Award, and the Prix Jules Janssen of the Société astronomique de France (French Astronomical Society). He is an Associate of the Royal Astronomical Society of London, and a Fellow of the three Indian National Science Academies and the Third World Academy of Sciences. Apart from his scientific research, Narlikar has been well known as a communicator of science through his books, articles, and radio & television programs. For these efforts, he was honoured in 1996 by UNESCO with the Kalinga Prize. He was featured on Carl Sagan's TV show Cosmos: A Personal Voyage in the late 1980s. In 1989, he received the Atmaram Award by Central Hindi Directorate. He received the Indira Gandhi Award of the Indian National Science Academy in 1990. He also served on the Physical Sciences jury for the Infosys Prize in 2009. In 2014, he received a Sahitya Akademi Award for his autobiography in Marathi, Chaar Nagarantale Maze Vishwa. He presided over the 94th Akhil Bharatiya Marathi Sahitya Sammelan held at Nashik in January 2021.

Books
Besides scientific papers and books and popular science literature, Narlikar has written science fiction, novels, and short stories in English, Hindi, and Marathi. He is also the consultant for the Science and Mathematics textbooks of NCERT (National Council of Educational Research and Training, India).

Non-fiction
In English: 
Facts and Speculations in Cosmology, with G. Burbridge, Cambridge University Press 2008, 
Current Issues in Cosmology, 2006
A Different Approach to Cosmology: From a Static Universe through the Big Bang towards Reality, 2005
Fred Hoyle's Universe, 2003
Scientific Edge: The Indian Scientist from Vedic to Modern Times, 2003
An Introduction to Cosmology, 2002
A Different Approach to Cosmology, with G. Burbridge and Fred Hoyle, Cambridge University Press 2000, 
Quasars and Active Galactic Nuclei: An Introduction, 1999
From Black Clouds to Black Holes, 1996
From Black Clouds to Black Holes (Third Edition), 2012, 
Seven Wonders of the Cosmos, 1995
Philosophy of Science: Perspectives from Natural and Social Sciences, 1992
The extragalactic universe: an alternative view, with Fred Hoyle and Chandra Wickramasinghe, Nature 346:807–812, 30 August 1990
Highlights in Gravitation and Cosmology, 1989
The Primeval Universe, 1988
Violent Phenomena in the Universe, 1982
The Lighter Side of Gravity, 1982
Physics-Astronomy Frontier (co-author Sir Fred Hoyle), 1981
The Structure of the Universe, 1977
Creation of Matter and Anomalous Redshifts, 2002
Absorber Theory of Radiation in Expanding Universes, 2002
In Marathi: 
आकाशाशी जडले नाते
नभात हसरे तारे

Fiction
In English: 
The Return of Vaman, 1990
The Adventure
The Comet
In Marathi: 
वामन परत न आला
यक्षांची देणगी
अभयारण्य
व्हायरस
प्रेषित
अंतराळातील भस्मासूर
टाईम मशीनची किमया
उजव्या सोंडेचा गणपती

In Hindi:

 पार नज़र के

Personal life

Narlikar married a mathematics researcher and professor, Mangala Narlikar (née Rajwade). The couple have three daughters: Geeta, a biomedical researcher at the University of California, San Francisco, Girija and Leelavati. He is the uncle of the Cambridge University social sciences academic Amrita Narlikar.

References

External links

Jayant Narlikar's Home page
An interview with Jayant Narlikar on virus from outer space (2003)
An interview with Jayant Narlikar on the origin of Universe (2004, in Spanish)
Jayant V. Narlikar's Summarized Biography
Publications of J.V. Narlikar – part 1
Publications of J.V. Narlikar – part 2
Cosmology, Facts and Problems (French)
Narlikar predicted neutrinos traveling faster than light in 1962

Marathi-language writers
Recipients of the Padma Vibhushan in science & engineering
Indian astrophysicists
Banaras Hindu University alumni
Indian science fiction writers
Scientists from Maharashtra
Recipients of the Padma Bhushan in science & engineering
Recipients of the Maharashtra Bhushan Award
Kalinga Prize recipients
20th-century Indian astronomers
1938 births
Living people
Emeritus Professors in India
Indian male novelists
Professors Emeritus
Recipients of the Sahitya Akademi Award in Marathi